William Thomas Condon (14 July 1901 – 30 August 1963) was an Australian rules footballer who played with South Melbourne in the Victorian Football League (VFL).

Notes

External links 

1901 births
1963 deaths
Australian rules footballers from Victoria (Australia)
Australian Rules footballers: place kick exponents
Sydney Swans players